Rubus vestitus is a European species of brambles in the rose family, called European blackberry in the United States. It is native to Europe and naturalized along the northern Pacific Coast of the United States and Canada (British Columbia, Washington, Oregon).

Rubus vestitus is a spiny shrub sometimes as much as 2 meters (80 inches) tall. Leaves are palmately compound with 3 or 5 leaflets, each leaflet wide, almost round, with a pointed tip and with teeth along the edges. Flowers are pink or magenta. Fruits are very dark, nearly black.

Rubus vestitus is one of the commonest species of bramble in the British Isles, found in most vice-counties, apart from the far North. Its preference for neutral to slightly alkaline soils places it among a minority of European Rubus.

References

External links
photo of herbarium specimen at Missouri Botanical Garden

vestitus
Berries
Plants described in 1825
Flora of Europe